Majid Mahdi Abd al-Abbass al-Nasrawi (born 1966) is an Iraqi politician who was the Governor of Basra Province from June 2013 to August 2017.

Nasrawi was born in the Ma'aqal area of Basra in 1966. He graduated with a Bachelors in Medicine from the University of Basra, and has also studied medicine at Cardiff University and the University of Queensland.

Nasrawi took over from the previous Governor, Khalaf Abdul Samad, in June 2013 following the 2013 Governorate election where the coalition containing Nasrawi's party, the Islamic Supreme Council of Iraq, came second.

References

External links
Official Facebook page

Governors of Basra Governorate
Iraqi politicians
Living people
People from Basra
1966 births
University of Basrah alumni
Alumni of Cardiff University
University of Queensland alumni
Naturalised citizens of Australia
Iraqi emigrants to Australia
Australian Shia Muslims